Carex viridimarginata is a tussock-forming perennial in the family Cyperaceae. It is native to northern central parts of the China.

See also
 List of Carex species

References

viridimarginata
Plants described in 1929
Taxa named by Georg Kükenthal
Flora of China